State Security may refer to:

 general concepts of security agency, national security, or secret police
 Belgian State Security Service
 State Security (Czechoslovakia)
 Stasi, or Ministry for State Security in the former German Democratic Republic
 Lebanese State Security

See also
 Committee for State Security (disambiguation)